Naomi Merlith Sim (née Plaskitt; 30 November 1913 – 3 August 1999) was an English actress and writer.

Life
Naomi Plaskitt was born in Bedford in 1913. Her parents, Hugh and Norah Plaskitt, were cousins. Her parents' marriage was poor and in time her mother took custody of her daughters. Her father was a solicitor and an alcoholic. He served as a soldier during World War One where he caught and died of malaria in 1917. 

She was initially educated in Bedford and later Scotland. When she was 12 year of age she met Alastair Sim while appearing in a play, The Land of Heart's Desire, organised by Scottish Community Drama Association. Sim was an elocution teacher at an Edinburgh school at the time and was 28 years of age when they met. Plaskitt left school aged 14 and joined Sim's school of drama as his secretary after her mother gave her permission. Meanwhile, Sim was the Fulton lecturer in elocution at New College, Edinburgh.

In 1932 she had completed two years at the Royal Academy of Dramatic Art under a scholarship when she replaced her ambition for drama with her love for Sim. They married and they appeared in one film together, Wedding Group, in 1936.

In 1947 they built a house, 'Forrigan', near Henley on Thames. Naomi would help Sim and give him advice, and he called her his "director". Together they unofficially adopted several boys who generally came from unhappy homes. The most noted of these was George Cole, who went on to have a career in acting. Cole appeared with Alastair Sim in 11 films, and in time he bought a house near 'Forrigan'.

After her husband's death in 1976, she wrote her autobiography that featured their life together. Dance and Skylark was published in 1988, She also wrote articles for The Oldie magazine.

Sim died in Henley-on-Thames in 1999.

References

External links
 
 

1913 births
1999 deaths
People from Bedford
British writers
20th-century English actresses
English film actresses
Actresses from Bedfordshire
Alumni of RADA